Destra Corporation Limited, previously known as Sprint Corporation and Ehyou, was an independent Australian owned media and entertainment company based in Richmond, Victoria founded by Domenic Carosa. Destra's interests spanned film, internet, music, theatre and retail, including Magna Pacific.

During its peak years, Destra was one of the largest online music distributors in Australia, while also specializing in hosting and domain registry. In the mid-2000s, the company reached $100 million in annual turnover. The company's shareholders included Prime Media, whose stake represented 44% at April 2008.

Following the collapse of Opes Prime in 2007, Destra announced they were suffering financially and it went on to lose $76.9 million between 2007 and early 2008. The company was split into a number of divisions before its subsidiaries were sold. Destra became defunct in November 2008.

History
Domenic Carosa and Anna Carosa founded Destra Corporation in 1993. The Carosas were only teenagers when they came up with the concept, which they originally called Sprint. In its early days, the company owned entertainment websites in Australia and formed Ozhosting.com in 1995 to provide hosting to small businesses. Sprint purchased a number of smaller Australian-based hosting companies over the next couple of years in order to increase its market share in the hosting market. This included BlueFire and also GlobalHost. Both companies remained as separate entities under Sprint but operated under the OzHosting.com brand.

In 2000, Sprint Corporation was rebranded as Ehyou in order to expand into other online fields besides hosting. This included the purchasing of mp3.com.au, with the aim of moving more into the online music and digital downloads market. Over the next couple of years, Destra expanded its hosting offerings geographically through acquisitions of Cyberhost, lasiaworks, and Ocean Internet's hosting division. Destra also acquired Webtrader in January 2001, a move which further diversified its services. The company was then integrated under the OzHosting subsidiary, making the hosting brand the second largest retail hosting company in Australia.

During 2002, Destra continued to acquire hosting companies, including Enet21 and SuperHosting. Most notably, Destra announced in 2002 that they had acquired a 60% controlling interest in TPP Internet, which was one of Australia's largest domain name registrars at the time.

In 2004, the subsidiary OzHosting was integrated into a new part of the business. The OzHosting brand was shelved, and OzHosting and Techex merged to form Destra. During the same year, Destra won the PowerTel Partner of the Year award. During its first year as the Destra brand, the company announced that they had reached a partnership agreement with Yahoo! to create a new suite of services that would be integrated into the subsidiary, OzHosting. In 2005, Destra reported revenue of over $15 million, up 73% from the previous year, with revenues of $15.739 million, up 73 percent.

In 2006, Destra was the largest digital music provider in Australia, with more than 1.3 million tracks in its online music catalogue. At the time, the company was strategically developing advertising revenue streams across its websites.

After making a number of acquisitions, Destra was greatly affected by the collapse of Opes Prime in 2008. In 2007–08, Destra lost $76.9 million, having made 13 acquisitions in the previous three years. In November 2008, Destra's divisions were sold in administration to companies including Fremantle Media; Central Station Records; Brand New Media; Eddie MacGuire's Visual Entertainment Group; producer of the Discovery Channel's hit show MythBusters, Beyond International; and Domenic Carosa's Dominet Digital.

See also
 Domenic Carosa

References

External links
 Destra.com company website

Companies formerly listed on the Australian Securities Exchange
Defunct mass media companies of Australia